Unidentified flying objects are things in the sky that were not identifiable at the time of observation.

Unidentified flying object or variations may also refer to:

Music
 "Unidentified Flying Object", a 1970 UK rock song by British rock band UFO
 "The Unidentified Flying Object", a 1966 electronica song by Perrey and Kingsley
 "(The Notes) Unidentified Flying Objects", a 2013 jazz song by Wayne Shorter from his album Without a Net
 The Unidentified Flying Objects, a US rock band led by Lisa Kindred

See also

 UFO (disambiguation)